Elections were held in Northumberland County, Ontario, on October 22, 2018, in conjunction with municipal elections across the province.

Northumberland County Council
The Northumberland County Council consists of the seven mayors of its constituent municipalities.

Alnwick/Haldimand

Brighton

Cobourg

Cramahe

Hamilton

Port Hope

Trent Hills

References

Northumberland
Northumberland County, Ontario